Endevouridae is a family of crustaceans belonging to the order Amphipoda.

Genera:
 Endevoura Chilton, 1921
 Ensayara Barnard, 1964

References

Amphipoda